Joakim Kevin Lagergren (born 15 November 1991) is a Swedish professional golfer who currently plays on the European Tour having previously played on the Challenge Tour .

Professional career
Lagergren turned professional in 2010 and initially played his golf on the Nordic mini-tours picking up his first win at the 2010 Landskrona Masters on the Nordic Golf League.

He earned his playing rights on the 2011 Challenge Tour at qualifying school and played 13 events before returning to qualifying school at the end of 2011 where he earned his playing rights for the European Tour in 2012. During this season on the Challenge Tour, Lagergren continued to play in the Nordic League winning the 2011 ECCO Spanish Open.

During his first season on the European Tour, Lagergren played in 17 events finishing 140th in the Race to Dubai narrowly missing out on automatically retaining his tour card for 2013, however a second consecutive strong performance at qualifying school meant that he did regain his playing rights on the European Tour for 2013.

During 2013, Lagergren had an unsuccessful season on the European Tour and lost his playing rights at the end of the season, returning to the Challenge Tour for the 2014 season. However the season was not entirely unsuccessful as Lagergren gained his third win in the Nordic League by winning the 2013 Isaberg Open and at the Marbella Club Golf Resort on the Gecko Pro Tour.

In 2014, Lagergren got his first win on the Challenge Tour at the Northern Ireland Open Challenge.
Lagergren lost a three-way playoff at the 2017 Commercial Bank Qatar Masters, before clinching his maiden European Tour title at the 2018 Rocco Forte Sicilian Open. Lagergren shot his first albatross on Tour at the 2018 Turkish Airlines Open as he holed his five wood second shot with 238 yards left to the pin on the par five hole 12.

In 2019, Lagergren finished third at the Alfred Dunhill Links Championship, two strokes behind winner Victor Perez and was runner-up at the same tournament in 2021, two strokes behind Danny Willett. He finished solo second at the 2022 Estrella Damm N.A. Andalucía Masters, six shots behind Adrián Otaegui and climbed into the top 50 on the DP World Tour Rankings as a result.

Professional wins (6)

European Tour wins (1)

European Tour playoff record (1–1)

Challenge Tour wins (1)

Nordic Golf League wins (3)

Other wins (1)
2013 Marbella Club Golf Resort (Gecko Pro Tour)

Team appearances
Amateur
European Boys' Team Championship (representing Sweden): 2009
Professional
World Cup (representing Sweden): 2018

See also
2011 European Tour Qualifying School graduates
2012 European Tour Qualifying School graduates
2014 European Tour Qualifying School graduates

References

External links

Swedish male golfers
European Tour golfers
Golfers from Stockholm
1991 births
Living people